Gustavo Adolfo Valdés (born 15 October 1968) is an Argentine Radical Civic Union politician who is currently governor of Corrientes Province, since 10 December 2017. Previously, from 2013 to 2017, he was a National Deputy for Corrientes.

Early life and education
Gustavo Adolfo Valdés was born on 15 October 1968 in Corrientes, into a political family: his father, Manuel Valdés, was twice mayor of Ituzaingó, while his mother, Juana Mosqueda, was a peronist councilwoman of the same city, where Valdés was raised. Valdés joined the Radical Civic Union (UCR) when he was 15, according to himself inspired by the figure of Raúl Alfonsín. 

Valdés was active in the UCR's student wing, Franja Morada, and was president of his high school's student union. He studied law at the National University of the Northeast, earning his licenciatura in 1994.

Political career
Valdés was appointed director of the Corrientes delegation of the National Directorate of Migration in 1997, a post he held until 2001. Under the governorship of Ricardo Colombi, he was appointed as the province's Minister of Government. 

He was elected to the Argentine Chamber of Deputies in 2013, as the first candidate in the Encuentro por Corrientes ("Encounter for Corrientes") list, which included the UCR; the list won with 46.9% of the vote. In 2014 he was appointed by the Chamber of Deputies to serve as one of the lower house's representatives in the Council of Magistracy, becoming only the second ever representative from Corrientes to serve in the council after José Antonio Romero Feris.

Governor of Corrientes
Ahead of the 2017 provincial election, incumbent governor Ricardo Colombi, who was term-limited, nominated Valdés to run for governor in the ECO list. He won the election with 54% of the vote. The election was widely highlighted by national media, as Valdés had counted with the explicit endorsement of then-president Mauricio Macri.

Personal life
Valdés is married to Cristina Inés Garro, whom he met while studying law and married in 1994. The couple have three children: María Milagros, Manuel Enrique and Gustavo Joaquín. Valdés is a Roman Catholic and is against the legalization of abortion in Argentina.

References

External links

Official website (in Spanish)

1968 births
Living people
People from Corrientes
Members of the Argentine Chamber of Deputies elected in Corrientes
Members of the Argentine Council of Magistracy
Governors of Corrientes Province
Radical Civic Union politicians
21st-century Argentine politicians